Kotbar (also spelled Kotebarh) is a census town in Chandipur CD block in Tamluk subdivision of Purba Medinipur district in the state of West Bengal, India.

Geography

Location

Urbanisation
94.08% of the population of Tamluk subdivision live in the rural areas. Only 5.92% of the population live in the urban areas, and that is the second lowest proportion of urban population amongst the four subdivisions in Purba Medinipur district, just above Egra subdivision.

Note: The map alongside presents some of the notable locations in the subdivision. All places marked in the map are linked in the larger full screen map.

Demographics
As per 2011 Census of India Kotbar had a total population of 6,083 of which 3,140 (52%) were males and 2,943 (48%) were females. Population below 6 years was 916. The total number of literates in Kotbar was 4,371 (84.59% of the population over 6 years).

Infrastructure
As per the District Census Handbook 2011, Kotbar covered an area of 1.143 km2. Amongst the civic amenities it had 478 domestic electric connections. Amongst the medical facilities it had a hospital 2 km away. Amongst the educational facilities it had were 3 primary schools. The nearest middle school and secondary school were at Attatar 1 km away. The nearest senior secondary school was at Gikhuri 2 km away. The nearest degree college was at Nandakumar 15 km away.

Transport
Kotabar is on Kayal Chak-Dhaka Chora Road.

References

Cities and towns in Purba Medinipur district